On the Death of the Righteous is a composition for choir and orchestra set to the text of John Donne by the American composer Jennifer Higdon. The work was commissioned by the Mendelssohn Club in 2009 to celebrate Alan Harler's 20th season as their music director. The piece was first performed on March 29, 2009, by the Mendelssohn Club orchestra and choir under the conductor Alan Harler.

Composition
On the Death of the Righteous has a duration of roughly 12 minutes and is composed in a single movement. The music is set to text from the sermons of the 16th-century poet John Donne. In the score program notes, Higdon wrote:
She continued, "Of course, the challenge for the composer is creating an emotional state that is equal to the text’s, and thus a music of enough weight and seriousness, without being particularly dark; to be lacking in judgment in musical sound and to reflect the even balance of opposites, upon the death of the righteous."

Instrumentation
The work is scored for SATB chorus and an orchestra comprising three flutes (third doubling piccolo), two oboes, two clarinets, four bassoons, four horns, five trumpets, three piccolo trumpets, three trombones, tuba, timpani, one percussionist, and strings.

Reception
Reviewing the world premiere, Daniel Webster of The Philadelphia Inquirer lauded, "Higdon faced a huge problem: How to compete with Verdi? Her solution was studied, but also (probably) joyfully indulgent. She had at her disposal Verdi's orchestra with massive percussion, expanded winds, and all the trumpets of heaven." Webster added, "In a sense she did not compete, but found in John Donne's serene musing on death the basis for another mood, another kind of music. That was an impressive achievement, for her music stayed in the ear, even after Verdi's titanic immersion in emotion and color." Reviewing a later recording of the piece, Olivia Giovetti of WQXR-FM similarly wrote:

See also
List of compositions by Jennifer Higdon

References

Compositions by Jennifer Higdon
2009 compositions
Compositions for symphony orchestra
Choral compositions
Music commissioned by the Mendelssohn Club